Marshall Waller Clifton (1 November 1787 – 10 April 1861) was an English civil servant, coloniser and politician.

Clifton was born 1 November 1787 at Alverstoke, near Gosport, Hampshire, England, to Rev. Francis Clifton and Rebekah Katherine (née Bingham).

He joined the Admiralty as an extra clerk on 9 September 1805, and was promoted to junior clerk on 15 March 1811, 2nd class clerk on 5 February 1816, and 1st class clerk on 21 August 1819.

On 2 July 1811, Waller, as he was known, married Elinor Bell (of Wandle House, Wandsworth, London, who was first cousin to Elizabeth Fry, the famous prison reformer). Waller and Elinor had fifteen children, one of whom died as a baby. Eleven of these children later came to Western Australia with their parents, and one child followed later (George, a Lieutenant in the Royal Navy, in 1843).

On 22 January 1822, Waller was appointed secretary to the Victualling Board for the Royal Navy at Somerset House. In 1828 he was elected as a Fellow of the Royal Society. After the position of secretary to the Victualling Board was abolished in 1832, Waller was retired on a pension and moved his family to France for eight years.

In 1840 the Western Australian Land Company was formed in London with the purpose of promoting a large land settlement scheme in the Colony of Western Australia. This was planned by a group of influential men including William Hutt, M.P (brother of John Hutt, Governor of Western Australia from 1838 to 1846) and Edward Gibbon Wakefield, upon whose principles of colonisation the company was founded. Marshall Waller Clifton was appointed Chief Commissioner and his son, Robert Williams Clifton (1817–1897) was appointed secretary to Waller.

The name of the settlement, Australind, a contraction of Australia and India, was chosen as it was hoped to establish trade between the two countries.

Waller and his family and the first settlers of the Australind region sailed to Australind on the barque "Parkfield" in October 1840, arriving at Port Leschenault (Bunbury) on 18 March 1841. In 1841 Waller was also appointed a Magistrate and Justice of the Peace. However approval for the settlement was not finalised until 6 April 1842, and after this Waller was given an allotment of land at 15 Clifton Rd, which he named "Alverstoke" and on which the original house still stands today.

The Western Australian Land Company collapsed in 1843, finally ceasing all operations in Western Australia within 3 years and the settlers were left to fend for themselves.

Waller's children all became prominent members of society in Bunbury, Australind and Brunswick, occupying many important positions such as Resident Magistrate (Pearce), Inspector of Water Police (George, who later returned to England and became Governor of Dartmoor Prison), member of the Town Trust (Pearce), Collector of Customs at Fremantle (Worsley).
At one time, the Under Secretary for Lands, the Under Treasurer and the Surveyor General were all grandsons of Waller's. In 1897 about twenty of Waller's grandchildren held senior offices in the Western Australian public service.

In 1847 Waller moved to Upton House, which was built from bricks brought from England as ballast on the Trusty when it arrived in May 1844. The house was originally built for Elizabeth Fry, who died in 1845 and her husband sold the house to Marshall Waller Clifton.

In 1844 Waller was appointed a member of the Leschenault Road Board, and in 1851 he became a member of the Western Australian Legislative Council. He became known for fighting for the rights of the small landholders, which caused friction with the larger landholders and merchants of the Colony. He remained in the Legislative Council until the age of 71, resigning in 1858.

Marshall Waller Clifton died at Upton House on 10 April 1861 after a long illness. His obituary in The Perth Gazette and Independent Journal of Politics and News of 19 April 1861 reads:

"It is with much regret that we record in our obituary of this day the death of Marshall Waller Clifton, Esq., of Australind. From his first arrival in the Colony, 20 years ago, to the period of his death, Mr. Clifton occupied a prominent position amongst us. When in the Legislative Council he was one of its most active and intelligent members. As a Horticulturist he was pre-eminent, the practical results of his various experiments in that branch of science leaving him no compeer. As the country gentleman, he was the personification of hospitality; whilst his agreeable manners, well-stored mind, and hilarity of spirits enhanced in no small degree the pleasures of his way-faring guests. In his family relations Mr. Clifton was in all respects patriarchal, and although he lived and died 'amidst a grove of his own kindred', there were many absent ones to grieve over his loss.
In society at large he leaves a blank, as all must feel who have appreciated his presence during those periodical visits he was wont to pay to Perth and Fremantle; when, as 'The observed of all observers' his elasticity of spirits and 'Bonhommie' served to create, at least, a pleasing ripple upon the too often monotonous surface of our every day life."
Marshall Waller and Elinor Clifton's children were:

Francis (1812–1892); 
Waller (1813–1894); 
Louisa (1814–1880); 
William Pearce (1816–1885); 
Robert Williams (1817–1897); 
Joseph Bingham (1819, died in infancy); 
Elinor Katharine (Ellen) (1820–1904); 
Mary (1822–1893); 
George (1823–1913); 
Gervase (1825–1913); 
Charles Hippuff (1827–1890); 
Lucy (1829–1906); 
Leonard Worsley (1830–1895); 
Rachel Catherine (1833–1852); 
Caroline (1835–1883).

In 1979, the descendants of Marshall Waller Clifton numbered over 2,100.

References

"Alverstoke": Emily K. Clifton, Artlook Books 1981; verbal anecdotes from various Clifton family members and descendants (Emily Ker Clifton, Ethel Ozanne née Davies, Brian Henry Ozanne in particular).

1787 births
1861 deaths
Settlers of Western Australia
English emigrants to Australia
Members of the Western Australian Legislative Council
Fellows of the Royal Society
19th-century Australian politicians